Mo may be:
Deg language (Ghana)
Wakde language (New Guinea)